Hakeeb Adeola Abiola Ayinde O. O. J. Adelakun (born 11 June 1996) is an English professional footballer who plays for Gillingham on loan from Lincoln City.

Club career

Scunthorpe United
Adelakun played youth football with Crystal Palace and West Ham United, before joining Scunthorpe United. He made his professional debut as a 72nd-minute substitute for Adda Djeziri on 29 December 2012 in a 1–0 defeat against Tranmere Rovers at Prenton Park. He became the club's youngest player at the age of 16 years and 201 days. Adelakun's only other appearance of the season was on 27 April 2013 in a 3–1 win over Swindon Town, coming on for Anthony Forde in the match which relegated Scunthorpe to League Two.

He made 28 appearances and scored 2 goals in the 2013–14 season as Scunthorpe won promotion back to League One. On 30 November, he scored his first goal for Scunthorpe in a 3–1 home win over Torquay United, coming on for Reuben Noble-Lazarus in the 55th minute and scoring the last goal five minutes later. He was named EFL League One Player of the Month in December 2017.

Bristol City
In July 2018, following the expiration of his contract at Scunthorpe, Adelakun joined Championship club Bristol City, signing a three-year deal with the option of a further year.

Adelakun signed for Rotherham United until the end of the 2019–20 season on 9 January 2020.

On 24 September 2020, Adelakun signed for Hull City on a season-long loan deal. He would make his debut for Hull City on 26 September 2020 away to Northampton Town in a League One game. He would score his first goal for the club on 3 October 2020, in the 1–0 home win against Plymouth Argyle. On 4 January 2021, Adelakun was recalled by Bristol City, ending his loan deal at Hull.

On 14 May 2021, Adelakun was released from Bristol City following his contract expiring.

Lincoln City
On 26 July 2021. he would join Lincoln City on a long-term contract. He would make his Lincoln City debut on the opening day of the season, coming off the bench against Gillingham. His first goal for the club would come against Bradford City in the EFL Trophy on 31 August 2021.

Gillingham FC
On 15 August 2022, he joined Gillingham on loan for the season. He made his debut the following day, in a 2–0 defeat to Harrogate Town.

Personal life
Adelakun is of Nigerian descent. His older brother Hakeem is a non-league player.

Career statistics

References

Living people
1996 births
Footballers from Hackney Central
English footballers
English people of Nigerian descent
Association football wingers
Crystal Palace F.C. players
West Ham United F.C. players
Scunthorpe United F.C. players
Bristol City F.C. players
Rotherham United F.C. players
Hull City A.F.C. players
Lincoln City F.C. players
Gillingham F.C. players
English Football League players
Black British sportsmen